Murderers & Robbers is the first compilation album by American rapper Project Pat. It was released on July 25, 2000, through Project Records with distribution via Street Level LLC. Labeled as an "underground album", it is mainly a compilation of the rapper's mixtape material from the early 1990s before a prison sentence interrupted his career, similar to Three 6 Mafia's Underground series of compilation albums released from 1999-2000.

Track listing
 "Pimptro" - 0:30
 "North, North" - 4:11
 "I Get da Chewin" - 3:24
 "Ridin on Chrome" (featuring T-Rock) - 4:11
 "This Ain't No Game" (featuring S.O.G.) - 4:17
 "Bitch Smackin Killa" (featuring Juicy J) - 4:08
 "Murderers & Robbers" (featuring Lord Infamous & DJ Paul) - 5:05
 "Red Rum" - 3:13
 "Fuck a Bitch" (featuring Juicy J) - 4:35
 "Easily Executed" - 3:14
 "Puttin Hoez on da House" (featuring DJ Paul, Lord Infamous, Lil' Glock & S.O.G.) - 3:23
 "Outro" - 1:21

Chart history

References

External links

Project Pat albums
2000 compilation albums
Albums produced by DJ Paul
Albums produced by Juicy J